Luisa Pimentel Ejército (born June 2, 1931), commonly known as Dra. Loi Ejército, is a Filipino politician and physician who last served as a Senator of the Philippines from 2001 to 2007. She is the wife of former Philippine President Joseph Ejercito Estrada, and was the twelfth First Spouse of the Philippines from 1998 to 2001. Her son, Jinggoy Ejercito Estrada, is an incumbent senator since 2022 and previously from 2004 to 2016.

Early life and career 
Ejercito was born Luisa Fernandez Pimentel on June 2, 1931 to Rufino Pimentel and Manuela Fernandez. She grew up and received her primary and secondary education in the town of Iba in Zambales. She later pursued higher education at University of Santo Tomas, where she obtained an associate in arts degree from the College of Liberal Arts in 1949 and doctor of medicine in 1954. After which, she worked as a professor at the university's Faculty of Medicine and Surgery and as a physician at the University of Santo Tomas Hospital. She later worked at the National Center for Mental Health (NCMH), where she became a Junior Resident. There, she met her husband, actor Joseph Estrada.

In 1960, she was a Training-Fellow at the Royal Park Hospital in Melbourne, Australia and Ballarat Mental Hospital Department. She also served as a Training Fellow at Ararat Mental Hospital in 1961. In 1962, she returned to the Philippines and established the Mental Health Department at Davao General Hospital in Davao City. For fifteen years, starting in 1972, she has also been involved as a volunteer doctor at San Martin de Porres Charity Hospital in San Juan.

Public role  

A psychiatrist by profession, Loi was dubbed First Lady ng Masa (First Lady of the Masses)  and Doktora ng Masa (Doctor of the Masses) because of her medical and outreach missions during her term.

On October 12, 1999, she received an Honorary Doctorate degree in Philosophy from Kyung Hee University.

After her husband was deposed in the EDSA Revolution of 2001, she ran as a candidate of the Puwersa ng Masa opposition coalition for a seat in Senate. She won, placing 11th overall, and served in the 12th and the 13th Congress, making her the first First Lady to win a seat in the Senate. With the election of her son Jinggoy in 2004, they became the first ever mother-and-son as incumbent senators in Philippine Senate history.

During her tenure (2001–2007), she authored 121 bills and 13 resolutions, some of which have already been enacted into law: 
R.A. No. 9241, The National Health Insurance Program;
R.A. No. 9211, The No Smoking Act;
, The Film Development Council of the Philippines,
R.A. No. 9165, The Comprehensive Dangerous Drugs Act; and
, The Clean Water Act.

Ejercito decided to seek re-election in 2007, but she didn't push through with it. At the end of her Senate term, she retired from politics.

Post-Senate
In January 2014, letters sent to the Department of Agriculture showed that Ejercito allocated her pork barrel to at least two non-governmental organizations linked to Janet Lim-Napoles during her Senate term.

In June 2014, she was named as the personal physician of her son Jinggoy, who was one of the senators implicated and detained for their alleged involvement in the pork barrel scam.

On June 2, 2022, coinciding with her 91st birthday, she released her memoir entitled “Love, Mommyla: My Memories of 9 Decades,” a 104-pager published by her daughter Jackie. Percentage of the sales of the memoir would go to their medical missions.

References

1931 births
Living people
Loi
Loi
Filipino psychiatrists
Filipino academics
Filipino medical doctors
Filipino women medical doctors
Filipino Roman Catholics
Senators of the 12th Congress of the Philippines
Senators of the 13th Congress of the Philippines
Women members of the Senate of the Philippines
Ilocano people
People from Zambales
Pwersa ng Masang Pilipino politicians
First Ladies and First Gentlemen of the Philippines
University of Santo Tomas alumni
Politicians from Zambales
21st-century Filipino women politicians
21st-century Filipino politicians
Spouses of presidents of the Philippines